Jitesh Saroha (born 12 January 1996) is an Indian cricketer. He made his Twenty20 debut on 25 November 2019, for Haryana in the 2019–20 Syed Mushtaq Ali Trophy.

References

External links
 

1996 births
Living people
Indian cricketers
Haryana cricketers
Place of birth missing (living people)